Joseph Victor Lawrence Krakauskas (March 28, 1915 – July 8, 1960) was a Canadian baseball pitcher who played for seven seasons in the Major League Baseball (MLB). He played for the Washington Senators from 1937 to 1940 and the Cleveland Indians from 1941 to 1942 and 1946. He is best known for giving up the final hit in Joe DiMaggio's 56-game hit streak in 1941.

He was of Lithuanian descent.

References

External links

1915 births
1960 deaths
Albany Senators players
Anglophone Quebec people
Baltimore Orioles (IL) players
Baseball people from Quebec
Brockville Pirates player
Canadian expatriate baseball players in the United States
Canadian people of Lithuanian descent
Cleveland Indians players
Hollywood Stars players
Major League Baseball pitchers
Major League Baseball players from Canada
New Orleans Pelicans (baseball) players
Baseball players from Montreal
Syracuse Chiefs players
Trenton Senators players
Washington Senators (1901–1960) players
York White Roses players